Wilton Daniel Gregory (born December 7, 1947) is an American prelate of the Catholic Church who has been serving as the  archbishop of the Archdiocese of Washington since 2019. Pope Francis elevated him to the rank of cardinal on November 28, 2020. He is the first African-American cardinal.

Gregory previously served as an auxiliary bishop of the Archdiocese of Chicago in Illinois from 1983 to 1994; as bishop of the Diocese of Belleville in Illinois, from 1994 to 2004; and as archbishop of the Archdiocese of Atlanta in Georgia from 2005 to 2019. He was the first Black president of the United States Conference of Catholic Bishops (USCCB).  He served as president from 2001 to 2004, when the USCCB issued the "Charter for the Protection of Children and Young People" in response to the sexual abuse scandal in the US Catholic church.

Early life and education
Wilton Gregory was born on December 7, 1947, in Chicago, Illinois, to Ethel (née Duncan) and Wilton Gregory. One of three children, he has two sisters: Elaine and Claudia. Gregory's parents divorced when he was quite young, and his grandmother, Etta Mae Duncan, subsequently moved in with the family at their home on the South Side. In 1958, he was enrolled at St. Carthage Grammar School, where he decided to become a priest even before he converted to Catholicism. He was baptized and received his First Communion in 1959, and was confirmed by Bishop Raymond P. Hillinger later that year.

After graduating from St. Carthage in 1961, Gregory attended Quigley Preparatory Seminary South and Niles College in Chicago, and St. Mary of the Lake Seminary in Mundelein, Illinois.

Ordination and ministry
At the age of 25, Gregory was ordained to the priesthood for the Archdiocese of Chicago by Cardinal John Cody on May 9, 1973. After his ordination, Gregory completed a doctorate in sacred liturgy (SLD) at the Pontifical Liturgical Institute at the Pontifical Atheneum of St. Anselm in Rome.

After returning to Illinois, Gregory performed pastoral work in Glenview at Our Lady of Perpetual Help Parish and at Mary, Seat of Wisdom Parish in Park Ridge, Illinois. He taught at Saint Mary of the Lake Seminary and served as a master of ceremonies under Cardinals Cody and Bernardin.

Episcopal ministry

Auxiliary bishop of Chicago

On October 31, 1983, Gregory was appointed by Pope John Paul II as an auxiliary bishop of the Archdiocese of Chicago and titular bishop of Oliva. Gregory received his episcopal consecration on December 13, 1983,  from Bernardin, with Bishops Alfred Abramowicz and Nevin Hayes serving as co-consecrators.

Bishop of Belleville

On December 29, 1993, John Paul II appointed Gregory as the seventh bishop of the Diocese of Belleville; he was installed on February 10, 1994.

From 2001 to 2004, Gregory served as USCCB president, just the second African-American to head an episcopal conference. He had been vice president from 1998 to 2001 and chair of several committees. During his presidency, the USCCB issued the "Charter for the Protection of Children and Young People" in response to Catholic sex abuse cases. Gregory was also a board member at the Catholic University of America in Washington, D.C. 

In 2002, in recognition of his handling of the sex abuse scandal with repeated apologies and the laicization of priests, Gregory was chosen as Time Magazine's Person of the Week. In 2003, Gregory stated that the US Supreme Court decision on sodomy laws, Lawrence v. Texas, was to be deplored. Then in October 2020, Gregory was interviewed in an Associated Press article which noted "Gregory has drawn notice for his relatively inclusive approach for LGBT Catholics, and said it was essential that they be treated with respect."

Archbishop of Atlanta

John Paul II named Gregory as the seventh archbishop of the Archdiocese of Atlanta on December 9, 2004. His installation took place on January 17, 2005. He was the third African-American archbishop in the US; the first two, Eugene A. Marino and James P. Lyke, were also archbishops of Atlanta.

Gregory has been active in the church in advocating for the prevention of child sexual abuse by Roman Catholic clergy and religious, and for implementing policies to protect the faithful from sexual abuse. He has been one of the leading bishops in the United States regarding this endeavor.Gregory wrote a bi-weekly column for the Roman Catholic newspaper of the Archdiocese of Atlanta, The Georgia Bulletin entitled "What I have seen and heard". In it, he regularly shared reflections about his faith, work, and experiences.

Gregory spoke out against the 2014 Safe Carry Protection Act, passed by the Georgia General Assembly.  The law permits licensed gun owners to carry guns into many public and private places, including churches, school property, bars, nightclubs, libraries, and some government buildings in Georgia. The law was supported by the Georgia Baptist Convention, but opposed by Catholic and Episcopalian church leaders. Gregory stated that guns would not be allowed in Roman Catholic churches in Georgia, except for those military and civil service personnel who are required to have them. He stated that carrying guns in churches places vulnerable individuals, such as children, those who are disabled, and the elderly, at risk. He says it is against Jesus' teachings of peace, and wrote, "Rather than make guns more available as a solution, we need leaders in government and society who will speak against violence in all aspects of life and who teach ways of reconciliation and peace and who make justice, not vengeance, our goal."In 2014, Gregory was criticized after the archdiocese used $2.2 million from a bequest to build a new archbishop's residence in the Buckhead section of Atlanta on property donated to the church. The residence was designed to also serve as a banquet and conference facility. In March and April 2014, Gregory apologized to parishioners of the archdiocese, saying that he had "failed to consider the impact on the families throughout the Archdiocese who, though struggling to pay their mortgages, utilities, tuition and other bills, faithfully respond year after year to my pleas to assist with funding our ministries and services".  Gregory announced that the archdiocese would sell the residence, although he had moved into it only three months earlier. In November 2014, the archdiocese sold the Buckhead property for $2.6 million, and Gregory moved into a more modest home, purchased for $440,000, in Smyrna, Georgia.

At a 2017 conference at Boston College in Boston, Massachusetts, Gregory called Pope Francis's 2016 apostolic exhortation Amoris laetitia as "document that recognizes the real and serious problems and challenges facing families today, but at the same time it is a proclamation of hope through the mercy and grace of God." Gregory said that Francis "challenges the church and its pastors to move beyond thinking that everything is black and white, so that we sometimes close off the way of grace and growth."

In 2018, a group of Catholics started a petition urging Gregory to remove "pro-LGBT" Monsignor Henry Gracz of the Shrine of the Immaculate Conception in Atlanta from his position as a spiritual advisor to victims of sexual abuse for allegedly contravening Church teaching. Gregory declined to do so, saying, "Msgr. Gracz is following the admonition of Pope Francis to accompany people on the periphery of society. His priestly heart is not closed to those who find themselves misunderstood or rejected."

Archbishop of Washington 
On April 4, 2019, Pope Francis named Gregory as archbishop of the Archdiocese of Washington. He was installed on May 21, 2019. The archdiocese comprises 139 parishes in the District of Columbia and the Maryland counties of Calvert, Charles, Montgomery, Prince George's, and Saint Mary's.

In an interview on August 1, 2019, Gregory criticized rhetoric from President Donald Trump, saying, "I fear that recent public comments by our president and others and the responses they have generated, have deepened divisions and diminished our national life"; he called for an "end" to "the growing plague of offense and disrespect in speech and actions."

When Trump visited the Saint John Paul II National Shrine in Washington on June 2, 2020, to promote an executive order on religious freedom, one day after the Donald Trump photo op at St. John's Church in Washington, Gregory condemned the visit, saying,"I find it baffling and reprehensible that any Catholic facility would allow itself to be so egregiously misused and manipulated in a fashion that violates our religious principles, which call us to defend the rights of all people even those with whom we might disagree… Saint Pope John Paul II was an ardent defender of the rights and dignity of human beings. His legacy bears vivid witness to that truth. He certainly would not condone the use of tear gas and other deterrents to silence, scatter or intimidate them for a photo opportunity in front of a place of worship and peace." It was subsequently reported that the White House had invited Gregory to the event at the National Shrine before it had been publicly announced, and that Gregory had written that he must "unfortunately" decline the "kind invitation," citing a prior commitment. 

On September 18, 2020, Pope Francis appointed Gregory to serve as the apostolic administrator for the Diocese of Saint Thomas, a suffragan diocese of Washington.

After the November 2020 US presidential election of Vice President Joe Biden as president, Gregory emphasized the need to "engage and dialogue" with the new administration. He noted a "clear divergence of opinions" on abortion rights, but a closer alignment of views on "respect for the dignity of our immigrant community"; an end to capital punishment"; and "the pursuit of racial and social justice." Gregory said he was "not going to veer" from the long-established practice of allowing Biden to receive communion. When asked why he would not deny communion to a president-elect who supports abortion rights, Gregory said, "I don't want to go to the table with a gun on the table first."  Gregory would deliver the invocation at the ceremony memorializing victims of the coronavirus pandemic prior to Biden's inauguration.

When asked in 2019 by a transgender person about whether there was a place for them in the Catholic Church, Gregory responded:"You belong to the heart of this Church. And there is nothing that you may do, may say, that will ever rip you from the heart of this Church. There is a lot that has been said to you, about you, behind your back, that is painful and is sinful. And so that’s why I mentioned my conversations with Fortunate Families. We have to find a way to talk to one another. And to talk to one another, not just from one perspective, but to talk and to listen to one another. I think that’s the way that Jesus ministered. He engaged people, he took them where they were at, and He invited them to go deeper, closer to God. So if you’re asking me where do you fit? You fit in the family."Like his predecessors, as archbishop of Washington, Gregory serves as the chancellor of Catholic University of America.

Elevation to cardinal

On October 25, 2020, Pope Francis announced he would raise Gregory to the rank of cardinal at the consistory of November 28, 2020. At that consistory, Francis created him a cardinal-priest, with the titular church of Immacolata Concezione di Maria a Grottarossa. Gregory became the first Black cardinal from the United States, the highest-ranking African-American Catholic ever. On December 16, 2020, he was named a member of the Dicastery for the Laity, Family and Life.

Extraordinary Form of the Roman Rite 
In 2007, Pope Benedict XVI's motu proprio Summorum Pontificum widened the availability of the Extraordinary Form of the Roman Rite. Pope Francis promulgated Traditionis custodes in 2021, restricting its availability once more. On July 22, 2022, Gregory promulgated liturgical norms in accordance with the new document. The restrictions, scheduled to take effect on September 21, caused consternation and division among some Catholics in the archdiocese because some affected parishes have been reliant on parishioners who are attached to this form of the liturgy.

Honors
 Honorary doctorates from Spring Hill College in Mobile, Xavier University in Cincinnati, McKendree University, Lewis University, Fontbonne University, Catholic Theological Union in Chicago, and Boston College in 2018
 The Great Preacher Award from the Aquinas Institute of Theology in 2002
 Inducted into the Martin Luther King Jr. Board of Preachers at Morehouse College in 2006

See also

Cardinals created by Pope Francis
 Catholic Church hierarchy
 Catholic Church in the United States
 Historical list of the Catholic bishops of the United States
 List of Catholic bishops of the United States
 Lists of patriarchs, archbishops, and bishops

Notes

References

External links
 
 

1947 births
Living people
21st-century American cardinals
Converts to Roman Catholicism
People from Belleville, Illinois
People from Chicago
Roman Catholic archbishops of Atlanta
University of Saint Mary of the Lake alumni
Loyola University Chicago alumni
Pontifical Atheneum of St. Anselm alumni
Catholic University of America trustees
Roman Catholic bishops of Belleville
Roman Catholic archbishops of Washington
African-American Roman Catholic archbishops
Cardinals created by Pope Francis
African-American Roman Catholic cardinals
African-American Roman Catholic bishops
Knights of Peter Claver & Ladies Auxiliary